Carol Ann "Annie" Wells (born 24 February 1972) is a British politician of the  Scottish Conservatives, who served as Deputy Leader of the Scottish Conservative Party to Jackson Carlaw in 2020. She has served as a Member of the Scottish Parliament (MSP) for the Glasgow region since 2016.

The Deputy Leadership position was abolished on 12 August 2020, shortly after Douglas Ross was appointed Scottish Conservative Leader.

Early life and career 
Hailing from Springburn, Wells worked as a retail manager for Marks & Spencer in various locations throughout Glasgow for the 12 years leading up to her election.

Political career 
Wells became involved in politics during the 2014 Scottish Independence referendum by joining the Better Together campaign and stood as the Scottish Conservative candidate in Glasgow North East in the 2015 general election, finishing third with 4.7% of the vote. She also unsuccessfully contested the Glasgow Provan constituency at the 2016 Scottish Parliament election, finishing third with 8.6% of the vote, but was elected via the Glasgow regional list.

Shortly after her election, Wells was made Scottish Conservative Spokesperson for Welfare Reform and Equalities. She sits on the Equal Opportunities Committee of the Scottish Parliament.

In late 2018, Wells was banned from Holyrood for leaking an embargoed committee report to the press. After a complaint was made that the MSP had "sought political advantage" by speaking out about prisoner voting before a report had been published, the parliament's standards committee unanimously ruled that Wells had breached the code of conduct for MSPs.

Wells served as Deputy Leader of the Scottish Conservative Party, alongside Liam Kerr, under Jackson Carlaw. However, they both were dismissed and the post was abolished when Douglas Ross became leader in August 2020.

On 12 January 2022, Wells called for Boris Johnson to resign as Conservative party leader and Prime Minister over the Westminster lockdown parties controversy along with a majority of Scottish Conservative MSPs.

In July 2022, she endorsed Penny Mordaunt in the Conservative Party leadership election.

Personal life 
Wells is a single mother and is a lesbian.

Notes

References

External links
 
 

1972 births
Place of birth missing (living people)
Living people
Politicians from Glasgow
People from Springburn
Conservative MSPs
Members of the Scottish Parliament 2016–2021
Members of the Scottish Parliament 2021–2026
Female members of the Scottish Parliament
Lesbian politicians
LGBT members of the Scottish Parliament
Scottish Conservative Party parliamentary candidates
Scottish lesbians
Scottish LGBT politicians
21st-century Scottish LGBT people